The Drava Bridge may be:

 Drava Bridge (D41), a bridge in Croatia, located along the D41 road
 Old Bridge (Maribor), a bridge in Maribor, Slovenia